Wilfred Tennyson Dauphinee (August 14, 1910 – July 11, 2007) was a quarry operator and political figure in Nova Scotia, Canada. He represented Shelburne in the Nova Scotia House of Assembly from 1941 to 1956 as a Liberal member.

He was born in Shelburne, Nova Scotia, the son of Alfred Tennyson Dauphinee and Florence Martha Ernst. He was educated at the Shelburne Academy, Dalhousie University and Acadia University. In 1937, he married Helen Louise Coffin. Dauphinee served on the town council for Shelburne. He was Minister of Trade and Industry in the province's Executive Council from 1950 to 1953. Dauphinee died in Nepean, Ontario.

References 
 Canadian Parliamentary Guide, 1952, PG Normandin

1910 births
2007 deaths
Acadia University alumni
Dalhousie University alumni
Members of the Executive Council of Nova Scotia
Nova Scotia Liberal Party MLAs
Nova Scotia municipal councillors
People from Shelburne County, Nova Scotia